Charles Henry Douglas Clarke was a Canadian forester and zoologist.

He was born in 1909 in Kerwood, Ontario, and earned a degree in Forestry, and went on to earn a PhD in zoology.
He was tasked to perform a wildlife survey, north of Lake Superior.

In 1936 he was part of an expedition to the region of the Thelon River, in the eastern Northwest Territories.  It was there he conducted the research for his best known publication A Biological Investigation of the Thelon Game Sanctuary.

In 1977 he was recognized with an Aldo Leopold Award.

The Canadian Section of the Wildlife Society created an award in his name, which noted:

References

External links

Canadian academics
1909 births

1981 deaths